The North Star 600 is a Canadian sailboat that was designed by the American design firm Sparkman & Stephens as a racer-cruiser and first built in 1975. The boat is Sparkman & Stephens' design number 2135.2. It was also sold under the name North Star 26 and Hughes 26 after Hughes bought the company back in 1977.

The design is a larger, heavier development of the North Star 500, with a coach house roof added.

Production
The design was built by North Star Yachts and Hughes Boat Works in Canada, from 1975 to 1977, but it is now out of production.

Design
The North Star 600 is a recreational keelboat, built predominantly of fibreglass, with wood trim. It has a masthead sloop rig, a raked stem, a nearly plumb transom, a skeg-mounted rudder controlled by a tiller and a fixed fin keel. It displaces  and carries  of ballast.

The design has sleeping accommodation for five people, with a double "V"-berth in the bow cabin, a drop down dinette table that forms a double berth in the main cabin and an aft quarter berth on the starboard side. The galley is located on the starboard side, amidships. The galley is equipped with a two-burner stove, ice box and a sink. The head is located in the bow cabin on the port side under the "V"-berth.

See also
List of sailing boat types

References

Keelboats
1970s sailboat type designs
Sailing yachts
Sailboat type designs by Sparkman and Stephens
Sailboat types built by Hughes Boat Works